Ebana is a village in Eket local government area of Akwa Ibom. It is one of the villages that make up the Afaha Clan in Eket.

Their language is the Ekid Language.

See also 
 Afaha Atai
 Ede Urua
 Esit Urua

References 

Villages in Akwa Ibom